The British Army during the Victorian era served through a period of great technological and social change. Queen Victoria ascended the throne in 1837, and died in 1901. Her long reign was marked by the steady expansion and consolidation of the British Empire, rapid industrialisation and the enactment of liberal reforms by both Liberal and Conservative governments within Britain.

The British Army began the period with few differences from the British Army of the Napoleonic Wars that won at Waterloo. There were three main periods of the Army's development during the era. From the end of the Napoleonic Wars to the mid-1850s, the Duke of Wellington and his successors attempted to maintain its organisation and tactics as they had been in 1815, with only minor changes. In 1854, the Crimean War, and the Indian Rebellion of 1857 highlighted the shortcomings of the Army, but entrenched interests prevented major reforms from taking place. From 1868 to 1881, sweeping changes were made by Liberal governments, giving it the broad structure it retained until 1914.

Upon Victoria's death, the Army was still engaged in the Second Boer War, but other than expedients adopted for that war, it was recognisably the army that would enter the First World War. The Industrial Revolution had changed its weapons, transport and equipment, and social changes such as better education had prompted changes to the terms of service and outlook of many soldiers. Nevertheless, it retained many features inherited from the Duke of Wellington's army, and since its prime function was to maintain an empire which covered almost a quarter of the globe, it differed in many ways from the conscripted armies of continental Europe.

From Victoria's accession to the Crimean War (1837–1854)

From the end of the Napoleonic Wars to the outbreak of the Crimean War, the British army's organisation, and to an extent its senior personnel, remained largely unchanged. The Duke of Wellington remained as Commander-in-Chief until 1852 (except when serving as Prime Minister). His successors were men who had served him closely, such as Sir Henry Hardinge. None of them saw any need for major reform of the existing administrative systems, dress or tactics.

Enlistments and conditions

A soldier often enlisted after being plied with drink by a recruiting sergeant in a pub. Having accepted the "Queen's shilling", he was allowed twenty-four to ninety-six hours to reconsider. The recruit was then medically examined (as much to detect the scars from flogging, to prevent deserters or discharged soldiers re-enlisting for the enlistment bounty as to detect other weaknesses or illness), and then formally took the oath of allegiance before a magistrate.

Soldiers enlisted either for life, or for a period of twenty-one years, which effectively was a lifelong enlistment. "Limited Service" enlistments of only seven years (longer in the cavalry and artillery), which were introduced in 1806 to allow the Army to be rapidly expanded during the Napoleonic Wars, were abolished in 1829. Enlistments of ten or twelve years were introduced in 1847, but at the end of this prolonged period of service, most soldiers were skilled only for menial civilian occupations and immediately re-enlisted. Re-enlistment was also encouraged by a bounty of several guineas. The long-term effect of this was to produce regiments with many experienced or veteran soldiers, but no trained reserves that could reinforce the regular army. Though some regiments had territorial designations, soldiers enlisted on a basis of general service, and recruits could find themselves drafted to any unit, often to bring a unit about to be posted overseas up to full establishment.

Soldiers' pay was nominally one shilling per day, but this was decreased by "stoppages" of up to sixpence (half a shilling) for their daily rations, and other stoppages for the issue of replacement clothing, damages, medical services and so on. In 1847, it was laid down that a soldier must receive at least one penny per day, regardless of all stoppages.

Many old soldiers were debilitated after serving for years in harsh climates or disease-ridden areas, although this was not the only threat to the soldiers' health; many barracks built in the late eighteenth and early nineteenth centuries were insanitary and more overcrowded than prisons and the death rate among men in their prime in barracks in Britain and Ireland was higher than that among the general population of Britain. Long term over-indulgence in drink also affected the health of many soldiers, though this was rarely admitted in official records. It also was the cause of most disciplinary infractions.

The disciplinary system was not notably more harsh than the contemporary civil Penal System, although soldiers stood less chance of severe penalties being commuted. The death sentence could apply for crimes such as mutiny or striking an officer, but was generally reserved for actions that were capital crimes in common law, such as murder. Minor infractions could be summarily punished with extra duties or stoppages of pay, but flogging remained a punishment for many offences, including minor offences, on the discretion of a court martial. A court martial could be held at regimental level (which might well be influenced by the attitude of the colonel or other senior officers), or district level where convenient, or a General Court Martial might be convened under the authority of the Commander-in-Chief for serious matters or offences involving officers.

The maximum number of strokes inflicted on a soldier sentenced to flogging (which had been a barbaric 2,000 in 1782, essentially a death sentence for nearly any man) was reduced to 300 in 1829, and then to 50 in 1847. Some regiments nevertheless rejoiced in the nicknames of the "bloodybacks" if they were notorious for the number of floggings ordered.

Only a small portion of soldiers were permitted to marry. Soldiers' wives and children shared their barracks, with only blankets slung over a line for privacy. Wives often performed services such as laundry for their husbands' companies or barracks. A particularly cruel feature of the Army's practices was that fewer soldiers' wives were allowed to accompany a unit overseas (one per eight cavalrymen or twelve infantrymen) than were permitted when serving at home. Those wives not chosen by lot to accompany the unit when it embarked were forcibly separated from their husbands, for years or for life.

Officers
The system of Sale of commissions determined the selection and promotion of officers in the infantry and cavalry. Once officers gained their first commissions through a combination of recommendation and purchase, subsequent promotion was nominally determined by seniority, with officers purchasing their successive ranks. The purchase system and widely condoned abuses of it worked against either the proper training of officers or any consistently applied career structure. Some impecunious officers who had served as subalterns at Waterloo were languishing in the same rank decades later, while wealthy officers such as the notorious Lord Cardigan could rapidly become the commanding officers of regiments, and subsequently become generals from their seniority as colonels.

During the Napoleonic Wars, a combination of large-scale expansion of the army and intensive campaigning resulting in heavy casualties had resulted in many officers being commissioned from the ranks or from middle-class backgrounds. Afterwards, such possibilities of gaining commissions became increasingly rare. In 1845, the army of Sir Hugh Gough lost so many officers during the Battle of Ferozeshah that Gough granted immediate commissions to five Warrant Officers, under his authority as Commander in Chief in India. He nevertheless was forced to defend his action before a board of enquiry.

The purchase system also generated snobbery on the part of wealthy infantry and cavalry officers towards the more studious artillery and engineer officers, who learned their "trade" at the Royal Military Academy, Woolwich, and whose promotion depended rigidly on seniority. No artillery officer was appointed to general command of a field army until 1842, when Sir George Pollock led the army that relieved Jellalabad.

Organization

Cavalry

The cavalry consisted of:
 3 Household Cavalry Regiments
 7 Dragoon Guard Regiments
 4 Dragoon Regiments
 4 Light Dragoon Regiments
 4 Hussar Regiments
 4 Lancer Regiments

In the British Army, the distinction between light cavalry (Light Dragoons, Hussars and Lancers) for reconnaissance and heavy cavalry (Household Cavalry, Dragoon Guards and Dragoons) for shock effect on the battlefield was blurred, chiefly because both branches used the same type of mount, which was better suited for the charge than prolonged hard service. (There were however no cuirassier units equipped with armour, other than the Household Cavalry who wore highly polished armour on ceremonial duty in London only.) The 1821 Pattern swords were in use, those for the heavy cavalry regiments being straighter and longer than those for the light cavalry. These swords were intended mainly for cutting rather than thrusting, and reputedly not very efficient (although their weakness in cutting was ascribed to their being blunted by being repeatedly drawn from and replaced in metal scabbards during drill.)

The four regiments of Lancers had been introduced in the aftermath of the Napoleonic Wars, in emulation of the French and other continental armies. Three of them were converted from light dragoon regiments and one was raised to replace a disbanded Irish regiment of dragoons. They copied the Polish style of dress used by Uhlans. The lances were made of ash. Later, bamboo lances were used; these were apparently unique to the British and Indian armies.

Except for the Royal Horse Guards (the "Blues"), heavy cavalry wore red uniforms. The light cavalry had worn blue jackets  since the 1780s but in 1830 it was ordered  that all cavalry should be dressed in red jackets.  This was rescinded in  1840 and, apart from the 16th Lancers, also known as the "Scarlet Lancers," the light cavalry reverted to blue uniforms.

Infantry

In 1855, the infantry consisted of:
 3 Foot Guard Regiments
 3 Fusilier Regiments
 8 Light Infantry Regiments
 7 Highland Infantry Regiments
 79 Line Infantry Regiments
 2 Rifle Regiments

Several of the regiments (the Guards and the lowest-numbered and therefore senior line regiments) had more than one battalion. Establishments varied but when serving at home, most line or highland battalions consisted of a headquarters, six field companies and four depot companies. One of the field companies was designated the grenadier company, and another was designated the light company. Rifle, light and fusilier regiments that historically lacked grenadier and light companies had a slightly different establishment. The establishments of battalions serving overseas was enlarged to allow for losses to disease or on campaign that could not be quickly replaced from the depot in Britain.

Most infantry wore scarlet coatees or tailless jackets, with greatcoats for cold weather. White cotton dress was used for summer wear in hot climates, particularly in India. The highland regiments wore elements of traditional Scottish highland dress, such as the kilt. The Rifle regiments (the King's Royal Rifle Corps and the Rifle Brigade) wore dark green (almost black) uniforms.

In 1828, the greyish-blue trousers worn during the later stages of the Napoleonic Wars were replaced by dark blue "Oxford mixture" trousers for winter wear. White duck trousers were worn in summer until 1845. Although the fantastic profusion of gold and silver lace on officers' uniforms was checked, decorations for other ranks' uniforms such as fringed epaulettes, lace and badges became heavier and more ornate. The false-fronted "Belgic" shako, made famous by depictions of the Battle of Waterloo, was replaced soon after the Napoleonic Wars by a flaring, "bell-topped" shako. In the 1840s, the tapering "Albert" shako, with peaks both fore and aft, was adopted. Guards units wore the towering bearskin adopted after Waterloo, while most Highland regiments wore the 'feather bonnet', decorated with ostrich plumes. On campaign in India, the low-crowned "Kilmarnock" forage cap was often worn, sometimes with a white cloth cover that shaded the neck and the back of the head from the sun. The infamous leather stock, designed to force the wearer to keep his head erect, was retained until 1855. Trimming it down, or even soaping it to reduce the discomfort to the wearer, was a disciplinary offence.

With the exception of the rifle regiments, the infantry were armed with the Brown Bess musket, essentially the same weapon the Army had used since the early eighteenth century (though a version with a percussion cap firing mechanism replaced the flintlock in 1842). From 1830, sergeants in line infantry units no longer carried halberds or spontoons. The Rifle regiments used the Brunswick Rifle, which was first adopted in 1836.

Artillery and Engineers
At the start of the Victorian Era, the artillery and engineers were controlled by the Board of Ordnance rather than the War Office, which resulted in wasteful duplication of equipment and paperwork. However, the ethos of the officers of both corps, who did not pay for their commissions but were required to pass a course at the Royal Military Academy, Woolwich, was very different to those of the infantry and cavalry.

The artillery consisted of the Royal Artillery, responsible for field and heavy batteries, and the Royal Horse Artillery, which was intended as part of cavalry formations and used cavalry terms for its ranks and units. Gunners wore blue uniforms. The Royal Horse Artillery uniforms had braid and trimmings similar to those of light cavalry uniforms.

The Horse troops and Field batteries were equipped with 9-pounder and 12-pounder muzzle-loading smoothbore cannon respectively. The Royal Artillery also possessed some heavy batteries of 18-pounder guns, which had good range and accuracy for the period but were heavy and difficult to move, and also heavy siege mortars, although in many actions heavy guns were also provided by landing parties from the Royal Navy.

The Royal Engineers in 1837 was still a corps of specialist officers. The Royal Sappers and Miners was composed of soldiers and non-commissioned officers who undertook siege work and other construction.

In 1832, the regimental mottoes of Ubique ("Everywhere") and Quo fas et gloria ducunt ("Where right and glory lead") had been granted by William IV to both the Royal Artillery and Royal Engineers, reflecting their shared heritage.

Commissariat
Supplies and transport were provided by the Commissariat, which was subordinated to the Treasury rather than the War Office. The Commissariat consisted mainly of officers and some non-commissioned officers, and generally hired transport and drivers locally. Supplies could also be obtained locally, but in theatres where these were short, they were purchased from contractors in Britain or the East India Company, and dispatched by ship to ports close to where required.

Colonial units
The British Empire, by the latter end of the 19th century, included colonies (some being populated largely or entirely through settlement by Britain, others populated primarily by indigenous peoples conquered or otherwise subjugated by Britain) that were considered part of the same realm as the UK, dominions (colonies which had attained theoretically equal status to the UK as separate realms within the Empire), and protectorates (foreign territories under British administration). The dominions raised their own military forces, under direct control of their own governments. Although British colonies could not raise their own armies, reserve military units were raised in many. As colonies form parts of the British nation-state, and defence is not a role delegated to local governments, the national government (ie., the British Government) maintained (and maintains) control over local forces. Within the British Isles, local forces were controlled by the Lords-Lieutenant of counties, appointed by the Crown. In colonies, the Crown-appointed Governors were usually also appointed military Commanders-in-Chief, in control of local forces (and in some cases also of regular forces). Most existed in a grey zone as neither within, nor without, the British Army, in common with the auxiliary forces in the British Isles until their administration was taken by the War Office from Lords-Lieutenant of counties in 1871 and they were increasingly integrated with the British Army.

The reserve military units of the Imperial fortresses (Halifax, NS until Canadian confederation, Bermuda, Gibraltar, and Malta) were generally raised under legislation of local governments but funded by the War Office and considered parts of the British Army, and hence appeared in the Army List. The Militia of Bermuda, the Channel Islands, Gibraltar and Malta were numbered collectively in the British Army order of precedence (of the six colonial units existing in 2021, only the Royal Gibraltar Regiment and the Royal Bermuda Regiment are considered parts of the British Army, with the remainder being British military units auxiliary to the British Army; a handful of other such forces remain in the United Kingdom-proper, such as the Yeomen of the Guard, the Army Cadet Force, and the Combined Cadet Force).

Only one regular regiment, the West India Regiment, which had been in existence since 1795, was considered part of the British Army, although its black soldiers were rated as "native", and not recruited under the same conditions or given the same pay as the rest of the British Army.

Role and campaigns
The first line of defence of Britain was always held to be the Royal Navy. The British Army traditionally had three main roles: the maintenance of order in Britain, the protection and expansion of the British Empire, and intervention in wars on the continent of Europe. After the defeat of Napoleon I in 1815, Europe was at peace for almost forty years, and the need to plan for war against continental enemies lapsed.

Internal security

In Britain, soldiers were involved in aiding the government by suppressing demonstrations and riots organised by political movements such as the Chartists, or those that occurred as the result of industrial or agrarian poverty and unrest. Units deployed to such duty often became demoralised through being quartered in public houses where drink was freely available, while the prestige of the army suffered. Cavalry (usually referred to generically as "Dragoons") were suited to suppressing widely scattered disturbances by agricultural labourers in the countryside and became especially hated. Such duties were one reason for the very long enlistments of British soldiers, so that many years of drill and discipline prevented them sympathising with common people.

Except in Ireland, the need for soldiers to aid the civil government and local magistrates declined with the passing of successive Reform Acts, which eventually extended the franchise to almost the whole male population of Britain, increasing industrialisation with migration to the cities and the organisation of county and metropolitan police forces. Nevertheless, troops were called out to maintain order as late as 1913, in the aftermath of the Tonypandy Riot.

In the growing British dominions overseas, British troops took part in the suppression of the Rebellions of 1837 in Canada, and the defeat of the Eureka Rebellion in Australia. In Australia, between 1810 and 1870, a total of 24 British Army infantry regiments served in a garrison role defending the Australian colonies until they were able to take responsibility for their own defence.

The British East India Company's armies
British rule in India was continually expanding and consolidating. The British East India Company had grown in less than two centuries from a trading concern to be the agency for the British Government in India. It had started recruiting its own Indian troops in the mid-eighteenth century. The company administered its territory as three Presidencies based in Madras, Bombay and Bengal, each with its own army. By the start of Victoria's reign, there was little opposition to British rule in Madras and Bombay, and the Bengal Army was consequently the largest and most often employed. In 1806, at the time of the Vellore Mutiny, the combined strength of the three presidencies' armies was 154,500, making them one of the largest standing armies in the world.

The Company also recruited its own "European" white units, which included some infantry battalions and several companies of field or horse artillery, mainly from Ireland. These were supplemented by units of the British Army, referred to in India as "Queen's" troops, whose maintenance was paid for by the Company. The most senior appointments in the Company's armies were reserved for British Army officers.

The establishment of Native Infantry regiments included twenty-six British officers and two British warrant officers. All Indian personnel were subordinate to even the most junior British officers, although junior British officers were required to become proficient in Urdu, or whatever other Indian language was in use in their units, before they could be eligible for promotion. The highest rank an Indian soldier could aspire to was Subadar-Major (Rissaldar-Major in regular cavalry units), effectively a senior subaltern rank. In Irregular cavalry and infantry units, which were locally recruited from distinct communities or absorbed from the armies of annexed "princely" states, there were usually only seven British officers and Indian personnel had more influence.

The Company maintained its own institution for training its British officers at the Addiscombe Military Seminary. Promotion in the Company's army went strictly by seniority for both British and Indian personnel. Like the system of Purchase, this worked against the proper development of officers' careers and abilities, as it did not encourage merit or initiative, promotion was slow and ill-suited soldiers or officers could nevertheless succeed to high rank merely by surviving long enough. Many promising junior British officers were tempted away from regimental duty to serve on the staff or as civil administrators, while Indian officers often became embittered at their lack of authority or opportunities.

The Company's army was dressed and equipped much the same as the British Army, although the Irregular units generally wore uniforms derived from the area where they were recruited. In the field, the company's British officers generally permitted themselves more suitable dress than the over-decorated and less convenient uniforms of Queen's officers. The artillery was generally lighter than the equivalent British Army equipment (6-pounder instead of 9-pounder horse artillery, for example) to allow for the harsher climate and generally more difficult terrain.

British expansion in India

One by one, the kingdoms and confederacies of princely states (such as the Maratha Empire) that resisted British control were overcome. However, a persistent feature of British policy was a nervousness amounting almost to paranoia about Russian expansion in Central Asia and influence in Afghanistan (see The Great Game). Obsessed with the idea that Afghanistan's Emir Dost Mohammed Khan was courting a Russian presence, the British sent an expedition to replace him with Shuja Shah Durrani, a former ruler of Afghanistan who had been ousted in 1809 and who was in exile in British India. This triggered the First Anglo-Afghan War, in which the expedition successfully captured Kabul. Complacent British commanders then withdrew many of their garrisons even as they were faced with growing popular resistance. The result was the slaughter of an incompetently led British army as it tried to retreat from Kabul (the Massacre of Elphinstone's Army). Although the British later recaptured Kabul, Dost Mohammed was restored and the British withdrew from Afghanistan having lost prestige and having stored up resentment and disorder.

In India, after Sindh was overcome in a short campaign, only the Sikh Empire founded by Ranjit Singh remained wholly independent of British control. Ranjit Singh had died in 1839, his Empire fell into disorder, and a war between the British East India Company and the powerful and increasingly autonomous Sikh Army, the Khalsa, became inevitable. The First Anglo-Sikh War in late 1845 and early 1846 resulted in the defeat of the Khalsa and a British takeover of much of the administration of the Punjab. However, there had been some desperate fighting and the forces of the East India Company under Sir Hugh Gough were spared from defeat at the Battle of Ferozeshah largely by self-interest or treachery among the top leaders of the Khalsa. The Sikhs remained restive under British control, and rebellions broke out in the Punjab in 1848, especially among former units of the Khalsa that had been kept in being. The army sent to suppress the revolts was once more commanded by Gough, and again suffered several reverses in the Second Anglo-Sikh War before the Sikh army was crushed. The annexation of the Punjab left no fully self-governing Indian state.

On the borders of India, frontier clashes, and trade and sovereignty disputes with Burma had resulted in the First Burmese War from 1824 to 1826. The Burmese ceded some territory to Britain but the Burmese kingdom remained intact. The Second Anglo-Burmese War, launched in 1852 with little pretext, further truncated Burma. The British suffered few battle casualties in these campaigns, but lost many men to heatstroke, and especially to tropical diseases.

British troops also took part in the First Opium War against Qing China, which broke out after Chinese authorities refused to compensate British merchants for destroying opium they had smuggled into the country. The outdated Chinese armies were easily overcome by the British, with the resulting peace treaty ceding Hong Kong to Britain, and damaging the prestige of China.

The last war launched by the East India Company was the Anglo-Persian War, which followed a Persian attack on the Afghan city of Herat. Fearing instability within Afghanistan that the capture of the city would cause, the British sent a force from India that compelled Persia to relinquish its claims to Afghan territory.

Mid-century crisis
In the middle of the nineteenth century, the British Army was involved in two major conflicts (the Crimean War and the Indian Rebellion of 1857) in quick succession. Although it was ultimately victorious in both, it was evident that without urgent reforms, the Army could not simultaneously carry out all its strategic roles. Many regular soldiers were in fact unfit for service, while there were no trained reservists. The Militia was almost defunct, and inadequate even for home defence.

Crimean War

The Crimean War was the first general war in Europe since the final defeat of Napoleon I in 1815. It provoked a public crisis of confidence in the Army.

Before the war, some small-scale changes had been made to the Army's equipment. The Minié rifled musket was introduced in 1851 for all infantry regiments, soon superseded by the Enfield Rifle (although at the start of the war some units still had the old Brown Bess musket). Some rifled artillery (such as the 68-pounder Lancaster gun) was tentatively introduced around the same time. The use of tinned rations simplified the provision of supplies. The war exposed the Army's inadequacies. Although the armies of all the nations involved suffered defeats and losses as a result of lack of preparation and incompetent leadership, the shortcomings revealed in the British Army caused greater public concern. In part, this was due to the increased general readership of newspapers such as The Times whose reporter, William Howard Russell, vividly highlighted the British Army's failings in his dispatches.

When the war broke out, there were nominally 70,000 soldiers stationed in Britain, but this included units at sea proceeding to or from overseas postings, some recruits not yet trained, and large numbers of soldiers too infirm to serve in the field. To furnish a field army of 25,000 for the expedition, almost the entire effective establishment in Britain was dispatched and the garrison in India was dangerously weakened. The army that took part in the Siege of Sebastopol was badly led, but won all its field engagements,  sometimes at high cost. The system of sale of commissions came under scrutiny during the war, especially in connection with the Battle of Balaclava, which was notable for the ill-fated Charge of the Light Brigade.

The staff work of the Commissariat Department, responsible for supplies and transport, proved unequal to the demands of the campaign. Supplies often arrived late, and were not distributed until they rotted. Commissariat officers adhered to arbitrary peacetime regulations, for example, refusing to issue nails in quantities less than one ton. The result was the death of many soldiers through disease (exacerbated by dietary deficiencies) and exposure during the winter of 1854–1855.

The army was rebuilt with many raw recruits and young, inexperienced officers. In 1855, British troops were twice repulsed in their attempts to storm the Redan, one of the fortifications of Sebastopol, before the city ultimately fell.

In the immediate aftermath of the war the Victoria Cross, which became the highest award for bravery in the face of the enemy, was created.

Indian Rebellion of 1857

Within a year of the end of the Crimean War, the Indian Rebellion of 1857 (generally referred to by the British Army as the Indian Mutiny) broke out.

In 1854, the East India Company's armies numbered 280,000, the vast majority of them being Indian. The first sepoys (native soldiers) recruited by the Company were Afghan mercenaries or low-caste Hindus, but in the Bengal Army especially, a deliberate policy had long existed of recruiting from among high-caste Hindu or landowning Muslim communities, so that the sepoys would have an interest in maintaining their position within their communities.

Many Indians had become increasingly concerned by wholesale British reforms to mainstream Indian society that were imposed without any regard for historical subtleties and religious traditions. Changes such as outlawing Sati (the ritual burning of widows) and child marriage, were accompanied by prohibitions on Indian religious customs, and were seen as steps towards a forced conversion to Christianity. The sepoys of the Bengal Army saw Indian society, which they had a stake in, under threat, and also resented encroachments on their own terms and conditions of service.

The flashpoint was the introduction of the Enfield Rifle. It was believed that the cartridges for this weapon were greased with a mixture of beef and pork fat, and to bite the cartridge to load the weapon would cause a Hindu soldier to lose caste and a Moslem to be defiled. In February 1857, the 19th Bengal Native Infantry refused to use the new cartridges and the regiment was quickly disbanded. Unrest continued through the spring, and the first open outbreak occurred at Meerut on 10 May 1857 after 85 men of the 3rd Bengal Light Cavalry were jailed for refusing to use the new cartridges. That night, the three Bengal units at Meerut broke into rebellion and freed their jailed comrades (and 800 criminals), and marched to Delhi, arriving there the next day. They were joined by mobs from the city and other soldiers, and pronounced themselves at the service of the aged Mughal Emperor, Bahadur Shah II. Within a few weeks, much of northern and central India was out of the Company's control and practically all the regular units of the Bengal Army had rebelled or had been disbanded or disarmed.

There were only 35,000 British soldiers in India in widely scattered cantonments, and reinforcements took months to arrive by sea, but fortunately for the British, the rebellion was confined to the Bengal Presidency apart from some isolated incidents. Although many rebels rallied to the aged Bahadur Shah, or the nominal King of Oudh, they lacked coordinated leadership. The British troops with Gurkha regiments and newly raised Sikh and Moslem irregulars from the Punjab suppressed the rebellion, often with great brutality.

The Indian Rebellion stretched the army to the extent that Canadian volunteers raised a regiment for the British Army, titled the 100th (Prince of Wales's Royal Canadians) Regiment of Foot, for service in India but it did not see service there.

Disbandment of the East India Company's Army
In the aftermath of the Rebellion, control of India was transferred from the East India Company to the Crown. The white, so-called "European", units of the Company's Army, consisting of three cavalry regiments, nine infantry battalions and many troops and batteries of artillery, were transferred to the British Army. There were objections, later termed the White mutiny, by East India Company troops who objected to the enforced transfer and their consequent liability for general service. These were suppressed without difficulty. Many of the Company's European soldiers who accepted discharge rather than transfer subsequently re-enlisted.

Following the disbanding of most of the Indian units of the Company's armies, an Indian Army was raised mainly from communities outside the mainstream of Indian culture, the so-called Martial Races. The British personnel of the Indian Army were restricted to officers. Although the British and Indian Army officers both trained at the Royal Military Academy, Sandhurst and frequently served together, there was rivalry and snobbery between the two institutions. Indian Army officers were paid more than their British Army counterparts and therefore did not need private incomes to maintain their lifestyle, and also had generous entitlements of leave to compensate for their devotion to careers separated from Britain.

Peel Commission
In 1858, the War Office appointed a Royal Commission under Jonathan Peel, the Secretary of State for War, to investigate and recommend changes to the British Army's organisation and administration. The Commission reported its findings in 1862, but Peel and his immediate successors were unable to introduce the necessary legislation to reform the Army due to resistance by entrenched interests connected with the government of India (who wished to retain their own separate "White" military establishment) and by "die-hard" senior officers, headed by the Commander in Chief, the Duke of Cambridge, who opposed any change on principle.

Volunteer movement
At the peak of the British Empire, the middle and upper classes were often militaristic, usually seeking to join the armed forces to increase their social standing, especially the Yeomanry regiments (volunteer cavalry, who had been in existence since the Napoleonic Wars). In 1858, an assassination attempt by Felice Orsini on Napoleon III, ruler of France,  was linked to Britain. In spite of the fact Britain had only just been in a war against Russia with France as its ally, there was now increased fear that war would break out.

This saw a surge in interest in the more affluent communities in creating volunteer units, known as Volunteer Rifle Corps. Many such corps were formed all over the United Kingdom. One of the most prominent was the Artists' Rifles (originally known as the 38th Middlesex Rifle Volunteer Corps), organised in London and established in 1860 by the art student Edward Sterling.

In 1862, the volunteers could muster 134,000 riflemen in 200 battalions, 24,000 artillery gunners, 2,900 engineers and a small contingent of mounted troops. The Volunteer Act 1863 formally organised the volunteers and laid down their terms of service. They were responsible to the Lord-lieutenant of the county in which they were raised. In contrast to the upper-class values of the officers of the regular army, that of the Volunteer's officers and many of the lower ranks was urban and middle-class. Rather than the Army's scarlet infantry uniforms, many volunteer infantry units wore the dark green of the rifle regiments or later adopted the grey uniforms of American volunteers (inspired by the Confederate States Army). For their part, regular officers were pleased to have nothing to do with the volunteers' citizen soldiers and officers.

The Cardwell and Childers Reforms (1868–1881)
In 1861, after absorbing units from the army of the defunct East India Company, the British Army numbered 220,000 other ranks in three Household Cavalry regiments, 28 line cavalry regiments, three Foot Guards regiments, 108 line infantry regiments, 2 rifle regiments and the two Corps regiments (the Royal Artillery and the Royal Engineers). Guards Regiments usually consisted of three battalions, the 25 most senior line infantry regiments consisted of two battalions and the other line regiments had one battalion only. The two rifle regiments had four battalions each. In 1855, responsibility for the artillery and engineers had been transferred from the Ordnance Board to the War Office and in the following year, the Royal Sappers and Miners were formally merged into the Royal Engineers.

Cardwell Reforms

In 1868, a Liberal government took office, headed by William Ewart Gladstone and committed to wide-ranging social reforms. The new Secretary of State for War was Edward Cardwell. The Reforms were not radical; they had been brewing for years and Gladstone seized the moment to enact them. The goal was to centralise the power of the War Office, abolish the purchase of officers' commissions, create reserve forces stationed in Britain and establish short terms of service for enlisted men.

Historians of the British army have generally praised the Cardwell reforms as an essential steps to full modernization. They point out that the Duke of Cambridge blocked many other reforms, such as the adoption of a general staff system as pioneered by the successful Prussian army. A minority of historians, chiefly political specialists, criticized the limited nature of the reforms. Theodore Hoppen says these reforms were:

Ending of purchase of commissions
By far the most controversial element of the reforms was ending the purchase system. The rich families of the officers had invested millions of pounds in the commissions and when a man was promoted he sold his junior commission to help pay for the more expensive senior commission. Legislation in Commons would reimburse the officers for their full purchase price. The measure was defeated, whereupon the government announced that all purchases were abolished, thereby destroying the value of all of those commissions. The House of Lords passed the remedial legislation and the final expenditure made by officers was reimbursed but purchase was never reinstated.

The system of purchase of commissions was replaced by a system of advancement by seniority and merit. It theoretically made possible further internal reforms by unblocking the avenues of promotion to deserving officers, regardless of their personal means. However, the need for most officers to maintain an expensive lifestyle restricted the pool from which most officers were commissioned to the wealthy, and contemporary prejudice against the Nouveau riche further maintained the aristocratic makeup and outlook of the army's officers.

Terms of service
Cardwell introduced the Army Enlistment Act (1870), which reduced the normal period of service from 21 years to 12 years. For the infantry, the first six year period was on active service with the colours. Most men passed into the Army Reserve after a few years active service, being liable for recall to the colours for the remainder of their 12 year term in the event of a serious national emergency. The minimum length of actual service required varied according to branch; six years for infantry, eight years for line cavalry and artillery, twelve years for the Household Cavalry, three years for the Army Service Corps. Although the benefits took several years to appear, the Act gave the army both a trained cadre and the power to expand, which it had lacked in the past.

In 1881, short service for the infantry was increased to seven years with the colours, and five with the reserve, of the twelve-year enlistment period.

Cardwell also reorganised the regimental system by introducing a Localisation Scheme in 1872. This gave every cavalry and infantry regiment and artillery brigade a fixed depot and recruiting area. (Recruits who expressed a reasoned preference were nevertheless allowed to join any regiment of their choice, provided there were vacancies.) Single-battalion infantry regiments were paired via administrative depots on a county-based system. One battalion would serve overseas while the other was stationed in Britain. After a few years, the two battalions would exchange roles. The establishments were standardised for all infantry battalions serving both overseas and at home, eliminating many anomalies. This in part resulted from the adoption of steamships to replace sailing ships and later the construction of the Suez Canal, which made the movement of troops between Britain and India a matter of a few weeks rather than several months.

Changes to organisation
In addition to these reforms brought in by legislation, there were other administrative reforms introduced by Order in Council. These included the abolition of the separate authority of the Ordnance Board and Commissariat, which became departments of the War Office. The Royal Artillery and Royal Engineers therefore came under the War Office. The separate administrations of the Militia and Reserves were also made the responsibility of the War Office. (These rationalisations almost halved the War Office's correspondence.)

The Commissariat, and the Military Train (a transport service, which had been created during the Crimean War) became the Control Department, which consisted of officers, and the Army Service Corps of other ranks in 1869. In 1875, the Control Department was split into the Commissariat and Control Department and the Ordnance Store Department (which later became the Army Ordnance Corps). The rank structure and nomenclature for Commissariat and Ordnance officers differed from those of the infantry, cavalry and artillery until 1888 in the case of the Commissariat, when the Department was finally merged into the Army Service Corps.

Discipline and punishment
Legislation resulted in General Orders being issued throughout the army which ended barbarous disciplinary measures, such as branding men convicted of desertion or persistent bad conduct (originally carried out to prevent dishonourably discharged soldiers re-enlisting). The reformers abolished flogging for troops serving at Home, but it survived as a punishment on overseas service until 1881, as officers insisted that extraordinary powers of summary punishment might be required in the field where imprisonment or removal of privileges was impractical. It was replaced by Field Punishment Number One.

Colonial units
Following the Crimean War, and the French invasion scare resulting from the 1858 Orsini affair, it was decided that the British Army needed to be repositioned to better protect the British homeland, and to better allow for expeditionary campaigns such as that to the Crimea. As an increase of the British Army was not being funded, this meant withdrawing units from garrison duty around the world. In some territories, such as India, this was not possible, as removing British soldiers could invite invasion by competing empires or insurgencies. Replacing them with native soldiers of questionable loyalty to Britain could potentially lead to rebellions.

In quieter locations of strategic importance, such as the Imperial fortress of Bermuda (where the North America and West Indies Squadron of the Royal Navy was based, and where a sizable portion of the Imperial defence budget was being lavished on fortifying the archipelago), weakening the defences could also not be permitted. In such colonies with populaces whose loyalties were more reliable, and where locally raised units (such as the Royal Malta Artillery) did not already exist, the colonial governments or administrations were encouraged to raise part-time units along the lines of the Militia and the Volunteer Force to enable professional soldiers to be withdrawn. This resulted in units such as the Bermuda Militia Artillery and the Bermuda Volunteer Rifle Corps, which contributed an increasing share to the manpower of the Bermuda Garrison between 1895 and 1957.

The only remaining permanent British Army garrisons were at Bermuda, Cape Town and Halifax, Nova Scotia, although token detachments remained at strategically vital posts such as Gibraltar and Hong Kong.

Childers Reforms

After a period of Conservative government from 1874 to 1880, during which Army reforms were halted (although much social reform was enacted), another Liberal administration enacted the Childers reforms, which came into effect on 1 July 1881. These continued earlier reforms, which strengthened regiments' county affiliations by discarding the numeral system and amalgamating most of the single-battalion regiments into regiments with, for the most part, county names in their titles. This created a force of 69 Line Infantry regiments (48 English, 10 Scottish, 8 Irish and 3 Welsh) each of two battalions.

The four Rifle Regiments (which now included a Scottish and an Irish regiment) had lost their role as specialised skirmishers and marksmen with the general adoption of breech-loading rifles. They maintained their separate identity and traditions (and the two English rifle regiments still had four regular battalions), but were also assigned fixed recruiting areas and depots.

The Childers Reforms further integrated the militia and volunteers into the regular regimental system, and formally established a reserve force. Most infantry regiments had a third militia battalion, which would be filled with recalled reservists in an emergency, and a fourth volunteer battalion (or more), although the volunteer battalions often retained their original titles. This association allowed regular units to detach instructors and administrative staff to the militia and volunteer units, raising their efficiency.

On the other hand, the cavalry were less affected by the reforms. Including the three regiments of Household Cavalry, the cavalry numbered 31 regiments, but the regiments were small, generally deploying no more than two squadrons on active service. An attempt was made to link regiments in threes, in the same way that Cardwell had linked pairs of infantry battalions, but this broke down. Nor were the Yeomanry (volunteer cavalry) regiments linked to regular cavalry units. Infantry units serving in some parts of the world (such as South Africa) formed their own detachments of mounted infantry from the late 1880s or relied on locally recruited irregular mounted units.

The Army to the end of Victoria's reign (1868–1901)

Conditions
Following the Cardwell Reforms, most soldiers served only a few years with the regulars before passing into the reserves. This minimum period of regular service varied over time and with arms of service, from as little as four years in the infantry, to as much as eight in the cavalry and artillery. The maximum length of service remained at twenty-one years. Generally, only those soldiers who became warrant officers or senior non-commissioned officers, or specialists such as armourers, served this full term, though in most units there were "old sweats" who served for two decades without rising above the rank of private soldier.

Pay was raised to one shilling and two pence per day before Cardwell took office. He nevertheless greatly improved the common soldiers' conditions by making the basic ration allowance of bread, potatoes and meat free, and also reduced other stoppages e.g. that for hospital care. Stoppages for damages to barracks or to a soldier's equipment remained, and were resented as this might result from ordinary wear and tear on campaign or exercise. However, Cardwell also introduced a system of extra pay for soldiers who earned good-conduct badges after several years of service. Some soldiers could also supplement their pay by undertaking extra duties such as those of cook, groom, officer's servant or (in the artillery and engineers) in road-making and bridge-building.

The army insisted on minimum standards of education for soldiers promoted to the rank of corporal, and higher standards for those promoted to sergeant or above. From 1871, there were compulsory education classes for new recruits, though this was discontinued in 1888 as most recruits had received at least rudimentary education to the age of thirteen. The illiteracy rate within the army declined from 90% in 1871 to almost zero by the 1890s, though fewer than 40% of soldiers achieved (or perhaps troubled to achieve) more than the lowest standard of education required.

Restrictions on the number of soldiers who could marry were eased, and all soldiers' wives could accompany their husbands when they changed station (though not on campaign). However, there was official and practical discouragement of soldiers (and officers) who wished to marry while young.

Following a report by the Royal Commission into the Sanitary Condition of the Army, which sat from 1857 to 1861, many new barracks were built, healthier and more spacious than previously. Most of these were in a crenellated gothic style and many are still in use. These improvements and advances in medicine reduced the number of soldiers who died or were discharged as a result of disease while on ordinary service, although diseases still caused many casualties on campaign.

Army leadership
After the abolition of Purchase of commissions, most officers obtained their commissions after attending the Royal Military Academy, Sandhurst. As most of the cadets at this academy were required to pay for their own education, uniforms and other equipment, officers were still drawn mainly from the upper classes, but they at least had to pass competitive examinations before entering the Academy, and had to attain minimum standards of education and military training before receiving their commissions. However, social exclusivity in most infantry and cavalry units was maintained by the high cost of living for officers, who were usually required to keep up an expensive lifestyle that required a private income above their officer's pay. An unfortunate side-effect of the abolition of Purchase (under which officers could transfer between regiments as vacancies became available) was that officers were tied to one regiment for almost the whole of their careers, which gave many officers a narrow, parochial outlook.

For almost half a century from the end of the Crimean War, the Commander in Chief of the Army was Queen Victoria's cousin, the Duke of Cambridge. Although not an absolute reactionary, his generally conservative principles and snobbishness often provided an easy target for critics and satirists.

Much of the actual conduct of operations (both in its planning at the War Office and in the field) was carried out by General Garnet Wolseley, who had established his reputation as an organiser in the Red River Expedition in Canada in 1870, and was appointed Adjutant General at the War Office in 1871. Although he supported the Liberal governments' reforms of the army, he was opposed to their foreign and imperial policies, which he believed to be indecisive and ineffectual. Wolseley was eventually made Commander in Chief (although Victoria wished the appointment to go to her martial third son, the Duke of Connaught), but the authority of the office was diminished by Parliament when the Duke of Cambridge retired.

Wolseley was instrumental in appointing a circle of officers, the Wolseley ring, or "Africans", to positions of influence. Towards the end of the nineteenth century, there was increasing rivalry and tension between the Wolseley ring and the rival Roberts ring or "Indians", who were protégés of General Frederick Roberts and whose experience was largely gained with the Indian Army or with British units in India. The quarrel between the factions complicated the appointments of senior officers to commands before and during the Second Anglo-Boer War and was perhaps never resolved until most of the officers involved had retired from the army.

Although the Army had established the Staff College, Camberley in middle of the nineteenth century, it did not attain the professional standards or esteem of the Prussian Military Academy, where officers of the German General Staff were trained. Much of the Staff College's syllabus and doctrine was provided by General Sir Edward Bruce Hamley, who was praised by foreign military experts such as Helmuth von Moltke the Elder, but who was regarded as a theoretician without practical experience by Wolseley and his intimates. Regimental duty was seen as more honourable than appointments to the staff, and officers were often discouraged by their Colonels from attending the Staff College. Entry to the College was supposedly by examination, but to prevent intellectually inclined officers from the supporting arms monopolising the College, they (and officers from the Indian Army) were restricted to a small quota, and even officers from the infantry and cavalry who had failed the examination could therefore attend. (The Indian Army established its own Staff College at Quetta in 1905.) Although Wolseley encouraged his protégés to attend the Staff College, he (and Roberts) preferred to appoint officers on personal preferences rather than Staff College grades. In many campaigns, officers ignored the Staff College doctrines and improvised transport and supply arrangements to meet local conditions and situations. British staff methods were never tested in war on a large scale until the Second Anglo-Boer War.

Britain had no General Staff until the early twentieth century, and the work of some departments at the War Office was sometimes poorly supervised and inefficient. One of these was the Intelligence department. Although some distinguished soldiers, such as Henry Brackenbury and George Henderson, held the post of Director of Intelligence, they were distracted by questions of organisation and tactical doctrine, in which fields they made their major contributions.

Plans
One intended purpose of the Cardwell and Childers Reforms was the creation of an expeditionary force capable of being despatched to a scene of war without affecting the security of Britain or the empire. The force sent to Egypt in 1882 when the Urabi Revolt threatened British control of the Suez Canal was roughly equivalent in numbers to one Army Corps.

In 1876 a Mobilisation Scheme for eight army corps was published. This scheme had been dropped by 1881. In the late 1880s, it was planned that an Expeditionary Force of two Army Corps and one Cavalry Division was to be permanently established, with one Corps of Reservists to be mobilised for home defence. This was frustrated by shortcomings in the cavalry. The Stanhope Memorandum of 1891 (drawn up by Edward Stanhope when Secretary of State for War) laid down the policy that after providing for garrisons and India, the army should be able to mobilise three army corps for home defence, two of regular troops and one partly of militia, each of three divisions. Only after those commitments, it was hoped, might two army corps be organised for the unlikely eventuality of deployment abroad. The Expeditionary Force of two corps ultimately came into being only in the first years of the twentieth century.

Dress and equipment

Infantry
In 1855, the infantry's tight-fitting and impractical coatee with its vestigial tails was replaced by a loosely cut single-breasted tunic of French inspiration. Within a few years, a closer-fitting double-breasted tunic was adopted. This was eventually replaced by a single-breasted tunic, of the form still worn by the Brigade of Guards when on public duties (e.g. when mounting guard during the summer months at Buckingham Palace.) Highland units wore a doublet instead of a tunic. The carrying of equipment on crossbelts and shoulder straps, which constricted the chest and restricted movement, was replaced by pouches suspended from the waistbelt and various patterns of "valise", intended to be practical in hot climates and to distribute the weight evenly. Experimentation with soldiers' equipment continued throughout the period.

Following the Crimean war, the regulation infantry headgear continued to be the cap or shako, with successive patterns gradually reducing in height, in line with European trends. In 1877, a conical Foreign Service helmet was adopted for troops serving overseas. It was made of cork or wicker, and was intended to protect soldiers from tropical heat or sun. The following year, the Home Service helmet was adopted for troops in Britain. In form it resembled the Foreign Service helmet, and was made of cloth-covered cork, topped with a finial spike, reflecting similar continental fashions. Highland regiments continued to wear the feather bonnet.

For campaign purposes, British troops have often been portrayed in films as toiling in hot climates in heavy scarlet serge uniforms, and this was certainly the case in the Anglo-Zulu War and the Anglo-Egyptian War (1882) for example. However, many officers took a far more practical approach. In India, during and after the Mutiny, troops on active service tended increasingly to wear uniforms of drab or khakee cloth. Khaki (an Urdu word meaning "dust") was first adopted in the late 1840s by Indian irregular units on the North-West Frontier. By the Second Anglo-Afghan War of 1878-80, khaki clothing was in general use, at first improvised regimentally, and then for the first time supplied centrally. In 1885, following the patenting of a fast mineral dye, a regulation khaki uniform was authorised for use in the Indian army. In Africa, Wolseley had lightweight grey woolen uniforms purpose-made for his expeditions in the Anglo-Ashanti wars. These and other "khakee" uniforms of grey serge or sand coloured cotton drill were worn by troops during the Mahdist War of 1884-85. Thus from the mid 1880s khaki drill was usual campaign wear for British troops in the Empire, and became official overseas dress in 1897. In 1902 a slightly darker shade of khaki serge was selected as the colour for Home Service Dress. On campaign the white Foreign Service helmet was often stained with tea or other improvised dyestuffs in order to be less conspicuous. Later, it was provided with a khaki cloth cover.

In 1898, during Kitchener's Sudan campaign, the Maxim sections of the Connaught Rangers and North Staffordshire Regiment wore their scarlet frocks at the Battle of Omdurman, and so were the last troops to wear the red coat in action.

The Snider–Enfield rifle, a breech-loading conversion of the Enfield rifle, was introduced starting in 1866. It was superseded from 1871 onwards by the Martini–Henry, which in turn was replaced in the 1890s by the magazine-loading Lee–Metford and Lee–Enfield rifles. From the early 1880s, the infantry tentatively introduced various rapid-firing crew-served weapons. Early versions such as the Gatling gun proved unreliable, but the Maxim gun (which was first introduced in 1893) was both reliable and devastatingly effective against an enemy charging in masses across open terrain, such as occurred at the Battle of Omdurman.

Officers remained responsible for purchasing their own uniforms and equipment, although they were expected to abide by various regimental and general regulations. They were required to carry swords that conformed to various official patterns. Before 1856, officers often purchased their own firearms. Although some bought Colt revolvers, the Adams revolvers were reckoned to be better suited to British needs, with their double action and heavy man-stopping bullets. The Beaumont–Adams revolver, with improvements to aid accuracy, was adopted as the official issue weapon in 1856. It was replaced by the unpopular Enfield revolver in 1880, which in turn was replaced by Webley revolvers in 1887.

During the latter years of the nineteenth century, the Sam Browne belt replaced previous patterns of belt and slings for an officer's arms and personal equipment. This was so practical that it subsequently became part of the uniform of officers in almost all the world's armies.

Cavalry
In 1853, a common pattern of sword was introduced for all cavalry regiments. It was designed for both cutting and thrusting, but the compromise design was not very successful during the Crimean War. In 1882, it was replaced by short and long pattern swords that were stiffer and intended more for thrusting than previous patterns.

The cavalry used carbine versions of the infantry's rifles. The Snider–Enfield Cavalry Carbine was too short to be accurate at ranges over 400 yards, but the Martini–Henry carbine was popular. They also experimented with the Sharps, Westley Richards and Terry carbines. Some cavalry units affected to despise dismounted action and refused to use their firearms.

Artillery

The School of Gunnery was established at Shoeburyness, Essex in 1859. In 1862 the regiment absorbed the artillery of the former British East India Company (21 horse batteries and 48 field batteries) which brought its strength up to 29 horse batteries, 73 field batteries and 88 heavy batteries.

On 1 July 1899, the Royal Artillery was divided into three groups: the Royal Horse Artillery of 21 batteries and the Royal Field Artillery of 95 batteries comprised one group, while the coastal defence, mountain, siege and heavy batteries were split off into another group named the Royal Garrison Artillery of 91 companies. The third group continued to be titled simply Royal Artillery, and was responsible for ammunition storage and supply. Which branch a gunner belonged to was indicated by metal shoulder titles (R.A., R.F.A., R.H.A., or R.G.A.). The RFA and RHA also dressed as mounted men, whereas the RGA dressed like foot soldiers.

The artillery introduced the breech-loading rifled Armstrong gun in 1859, but this early breech-loader suffered gas leakages and breech failures in the field. The Royal Artillery took the retrograde step of replacing them with comparatively foolproof muzzle-loading (although rifled) guns, beginning with the RML 9 pounder 8 and 6 cwt guns, from 1871. These had the same range as contemporary breech-loading weapons, but had a much slower rate of fire. As the British Army was not involved in any wars against comparable continental armies, their inadequacy was not apparent. Breech-loading guns were reintroduced in 1883, starting with the Ordnance BL 12 pounder 7 cwt, but it took almost a decade before they were generally issued.

However, the Army led in the development of Mountain artillery, introducing light guns that could be rapidly broken down into several smaller pieces, which could be carried on mules or pack horses over terrain too rough for field artillery.

Engineers
The Royal Engineers were the corps most affected by technological advance. In addition to their traditional duties of fortification, road and bridge-building, they also became responsible for the operation of field telegraphs, the construction and operation of railways, and even the provision of balloons that provided observers with a "bird's-eye" view of enemy positions.

Campaigns

India, Afghanistan, China and Burma

Once the Indian Rebellion had been crushed, the only armed opposition to British rule in India came from the Pakhtun inhabitants of the North West Frontier Province adjacent to Afghanistan. Numerous expeditions were launched to subdue rebellious tribes or regions. Although the Indian units of the Indian Army bore the brunt of campaigns on the frontier, British units formed part of most Indian Army formations.

British anxieties over Russian ambitions in Central Asia remained, and were exacerbated by the Russo-Turkish War (1877–1878) during which Britain sent a fleet through the Dardanelles as a gesture of support for Turkey, and also deployed a division of troops in Malta. In the late 1870s, a Russian diplomatic mission was installed in Kabul. The British demanded that they also have a mission in Kabul, and when this was refused, British armies invaded the country, precipitating the Second Anglo-Afghan War. Once again, after initial successes, troops were withdrawn only for popular rebellions to threaten the remaining garrisons. On this occasion, the army under Lord Roberts at Kabul repelled the Afghan attacks, then made an epic march to relieve another beleaguered garrison in Kandahar. Having installed Abdur Rahman Khan as Emir, the British withdrew.

When Russia seized some Afghan territory in the Panjdeh Incident there was renewed fear and war fever, but the incident was settled by diplomacy, and Afghanistan's territorial integrity was guaranteed. For the rest of the century, there were several uprisings on the frontier, as the British extended their authority into remote areas such as Gilgit and Chitral. There were major uprisings towards the end of the nineteenth century in Malakand and Tirah.

Further disputes with China after the Treaty of Nanking led to the Second Opium War, which began even as the Indian Rebellion of 1857 was being suppressed. A combined British-French-American force defeated China again, with the Chinese government being forced to sign yet another unequal treaty. In 1900, British and Indian troops took part in the fighting against the Boxer Rebellion. In Burma in 1886, disputes over the treaties signed earlier in the century between Britain and Burma led to the Third Anglo-Burmese War, after which the entire country was finally annexed to Britain.

Africa
There were several campaigns in Africa before the end of the 19th century, during the period known as the Scramble for Africa. There was a punitive expedition in 1868 to Abyssinia and another to Ashanti in 1874. However, Britain's strategic interests generally lay in the extreme north and south of the continent.

South Africa

Britain had annexed the Cape of Good Hope from Holland during the Napoleonic Wars. They subsequently fought several campaigns against neighbouring African peoples such as the Xhosa. The Dutch-speaking settlers in the Cape objected to British rule and trekked north and east to set up their own republics of the Orange Free State and the Transvaal, although Britain forestalled them in Natal.

The new colony in Natal adjoined the territory of the Zulu Empire. In 1879, following a demand for the Zulu armies to disband, the Anglo-Zulu War began. The early days of the war were marked by a disaster at Isandlwana, redeemed in the view of many by a famous defence at Rorke's Drift. The war ended with the defeat and subjugation of the Zulus.

Shortly afterwards, the Boer republic of the Transvaal gained its independence after the First Anglo-Boer War. The main engagement of the war was the Battle of Majuba, where a British force was heavily defeated by Boer irregular marksmen. The British commander, Sir George Colley, one of Wolseley's favourites, was killed. Gladstone's government agreed to Boer independence to avoid the expense of a campaign of conquest and subsequent occupation but many British soldiers (including Wolseley and Roberts) were left eager for revenge for their humiliation.

Egypt and Sudan

A major feature of British strategic thinking was the Suez Canal, opened in 1869, which cut the sea journey between Britain and India by two thirds. A political crisis in Egypt, the Urabi Revolt, led Britain to intervene in 1882. Facing regular Egyptian troops in entrenchments, Wolseley used novel tactics of a night approach march in close column followed by a bayonet assault at dawn to crush the dissident force at the Battle of Tel el-Kebir. Britain restored the Khedive Tewfik Pasha and established control over much of Egypt's policy.

This also forced Britain to intervene in Egypt's nominal dependency, the Sudan. There were some bloody battles near the Red Sea port of Suakin. General Charles George Gordon was originally sent to superintend a withdrawal but chose instead to defend Khartoum against the Mahdi Muhammad Ahmed. After a prolonged siege, the Egyptian defenders of Khartoum were overwhelmed and Gordon was killed. A British relief expedition by camel across the deserts of northern Sudan arrived two days too late.

Several years later, having rebuilt an Egyptian army (including British and many Sudanese troops) and constructed railways and fleets of Nile steamboats to secure the lines of communication across the desert, the British again advanced into the Sudan under General Kitchener. The forces of the Khalifa Abdallahi ibn Muhammad, successor to the Mahdi, were bloodily defeated at the Battle of Omdurman and Britain established control over the Sudan. The last potential Anglo-French colonial dispute was resolved shortly afterwards in the Fashoda Incident, when a French expedition withdrew from southern Sudan and France acknowledged Britain's possession. This was one of the incidents resulting in an end to the long-standing colonial rivalries between Britain and France.

Second Boer War

The Second Anglo-Boer War, which broke out almost at the end of Victoria's reign, was another major milestone in the British Army's development. Britain was able to mobilise unprecedented numbers of troops including reserves and volunteers to fight in South Africa, and to transport and maintain them there thanks to Britain's industrial resources, the Royal Navy and Britain's merchant fleet. However, many shortcomings in administration, training, tactics and intelligence were revealed.

The war began in 1899 after tension between the British and the two Dutch Boer republics culminated in the Boers declaring war. The outnumbered British forces in Natal and Cape Colony were quickly surrounded and besieged, but it was generally expected that a quickly mobilised Army Corps under General Redvers Buller, GOCinC of Aldershot Command and one of Wolseley's most famous protégés, would soon overcome the Boers. Buller's command was "about the equivalent of the First Army Corps of the existing mobilization scheme." However, once in South Africa the corps was never able to operate as a cohesive force and the three divisions and one cavalry division were widely dispersed.

The British suffered a number of defeats at the hands of Boers using magazine rifles and modern field artillery, culminating in Black Week. It was evident that British tactics had not kept up with improvements in weapons technology. Experience gained against enemies such as the Zulus or Sudanese proved irrelevant against the Boers. Troops trained in the field for only two months each year; the rest of the time was spent in ceremonial or routine barrack duties. Officers, where not preoccupied with sporting or social activities, were engaged in tedious paperwork; each company required monthly returns totalling 400 pages.

The Royal Artillery several times deployed guns in exposed positions within rifle range of concealed Boers. This was sometimes the result of a misleading analysis of Prussian artillery tactics during the Franco-Prussian War, when guns had often been pushed into the front line to suppress enemy infantry. The same tactics applied in South Africa resulted only in needless casualties.

The infantry were not as good at marksmanship and fieldcraft as the Boers. Individual fire was discouraged, and troops still relied on firing volleys on the orders of an officer. Attempts to repeat Wolseley's tactics at Tel-el-Kabir against the Boers resulted in heavy losses at battles such as Magersfontein. The infantry finally won decisive victories only once properly coordinated with artillery, for example at the Relief of Ladysmith.

The cavalry, obsessed with the charge with cold steel, had "ceased to be in any useful sense mobile". They used heavy chargers as mounts rather than lighter horses. The heavy mounts required acclimatisation and recovery after long sea voyages, and needed plenty of forage when grazing was sparse. They were also overloaded with unnecessary or over-decorated equipment and saddlery. The average life expectancy of a British horse from the time of its arrival in South Africa was around six weeks.

Although reformers such as Major Henry Havelock and the Canadian Lieutenant Colonel George Denison had long advocated the adoption of mounted infantry tactics, they merely provoked varying degrees of opposition and obstruction from the cavalry's senior officers. Most of the tactical and strategic tasks traditionally undertaken by light cavalry were therefore performed by mounted infantry detachments or by colonial (Australian, New Zealand, Canadian and South African) contingents of Light Horse. Later in the war, the dispersal of many of the Boers into small guerrilla bands made artillery units redundant, and several units of Royal Artillery Mounted Rifles were formed from among the RA.

The supply arrangements often broke down, though this was partly caused during the early part of the war by the existence of three separate establishments (Home, Indian and Egyptian) for units and formations. Lord Kitchener's attempts to impose a single system in early 1900 led to him being nicknamed "Kitchener of Chaos".

Even before Black Week, concerns over the overall direction of the war had caused the government to mobilise yet more troops, including contingents of volunteers, and appoint Lord Roberts to command in South Africa. Roberts used his superiority in strength to overwhelm the Boer armies, and capture the capitals of both Boer republics. Although his forces suffered few casualties in battle, shortcomings in the transport and medical sections resulted in many needless casualties through shortage of supplies and enteric fevers.

Having announced the annexation of the Boer republics, Roberts returned to an appointment as Commander in Chief in Ireland, leaving Lord Kitchener to oversee the final operations. In fact, the Boers maintained a guerilla fight for over a year. The British response was marked by the indiscriminate removal of Boer non-combatants including women and children into concentration camps where many died, again through poor rations and sanitation. Kitchener's methods against the very mobile Boer fighters were often expensive and wasteful, until near the end of the war when the Boers were finally worn down by exhaustion.

The war also saw the first substantial deployment outside their own borders of troops from the present and future Dominions (Australia, Canada, Newfoundland, New Zealand and South Africa).

End of the Victorian era
During the second Boer War, a fourth regiment of guards (the Irish Guards) had been formed, at the instigation of Lord Roberts.

Queen Victoria died in 1901, a few months before the end of the Boer War. At her death, the differences between the British Army and those of most nations in Europe had become accentuated in many ways. The British soldier's jargon illustrated that almost all soldiers would serve in India or Africa at some time during their enlistments. Hindi, Urdu, Arabic or to a lesser extent Bantu words and phrases sprinkled soldiers' conversation.

Most British Army officers and many of the longer-serving soldiers had first-hand experience of active service and combat, though not of the large-scale manoeuvres and operations for which the conscript armies of Europe planned and trained. Indeed, the Chobham Manoeuvres of 1853 involving 7,000 troops were the first such manoeuvres since the Napoleonic Wars.

Few armies other than those of the dominions within the British empire had attempted to emulate the British Army's systems. From 1856 to 1870, the French Army had to some extent inspired the organisation, dress and tactics of many other armies, including the British; after the Franco-Prussian War of 1870, which ended in French defeat, the Prussian Army became the model to which others aspired.

It was recognised by many British politicians that the period of splendid isolation was ending and the Army might well be committed to conflict in Europe. Others aspects of British society were unfavourable for a large-scale expansion of the Army. Many of the Army's recruits during the Boer War had proved to be of inadequate physique or in poor health, through squalid housing or lack of medical provision. Within a few years of Victoria's death, a Liberal government committed to welfare reforms was elected.

The lessons the Army had learned during the Boer War were addressed at several levels. The Esher Report resulted in several further reforms to the higher level organisation of the Army. Boer tactics were adopted by the infantry and both individual and section marksmanship were greatly improved. The cavalry emphasised dismounted tactics, although still with resistance from some of the cavalry leaders who were to command the Army during the First World War.

Notes

References and further reading
 
 
 Barnett, Correlli. Britain and Her Army 1509-1970: A Military, Political and Social Survey (1970)
 
 Beckett, Ian F. W. A British Profession of Arms: The Politics of Command in the Late Victorian Army (University of Oklahoma Press, 2018).
 Beckett, Ian F. W. Victoria's Wars (Shire Publications, 1998). 2nd edition "History in Camera" series.
 Bennett, Mark. "Portrayals of the British militia, 1852–1916." Historical Research 91.252 (2018): 333-352. online
 Blanco, Richard L. "Army Recruiting Reforms—1861—1867." Journal of the Society for Army Historical Research 46.188 (1968): 217-224. online
 Bond, Brian. "Recruiting the Victorian Army 1870-92" Victorian Studies (1962) 5#4 pp. 331-338 online
 Bond, Brian. "The Late Victorian Army," History Today (1961) 11#9 pp 616-624 online.
 
 
 
 Gallagher, Thomas F. "'Cardwellian Mysteries': The Fate of the British Army Regulation Bill, 1871." Historical Journal 18#2 (1975): 327–348.
 Gooch, Brison D. Recent Literature on Queen Victoria's Little Wars Victorian Studies, 17#2 (1973): 217-224 online.
 Gosling, Edward Peter Joshua. "Tommy Atkins, War Office Reform and the Social and Cultural Presence of the Late-Victorian Army in Britain, c. 1868–1899." (PhD thesis, Plymouth U. 2016). Bibliography, pp 375–95.online
 Hartwell, Nicole M. "A repository of virtue? The United Service Museum, collecting, and the professionalization of the British Armed Forces, 1829–1864." Journal of the History of Collections 31.1 (2019): 77-91.
 Hay, George. The Yeomanry cavalry and military identities in rural Britain, 1815–1914 (Springer, 2017).
 
 
 
 
 
 
 Mansfield, Nick. Soldiers as Citizens: Popular Politics and the Nineteenth-century British Military (Liverpool University Press, 2019).
 
 Miller, Stephen M. "In Support of the" Imperial Mission"? Volunteering for the South African War, 1899-1902." Journal of Military History 69.3 (2005): 691-711.
 
 Pulsifer, Cameron. "Beyond the Queen's Shilling: Reflections on the Pay of Other Ranks in the Victorian British Army." Journal of the Society for Army Historical Research 80.324 (2002): 326-334. online
 
 
 Seligmann, Matthew S. "Failing to Prepare for the Great War? The Absence of Grand Strategy in British War Planning before 1914" War in History (2017) 24#4 414-37.
 
 
 
 
 
 Tucker, Albert V. "Army and Society in England 1870–1900: A Reassessment of the Cardwell Reforms," Journal of British Studies (1963) 2#2 pp. 110–141 in JSTOR
 Winrow, Andrew. The British Army Regular Mounted Infantry 1880–1913 (Taylor & Francis, 2016).
 

19th-century history of the British Army
Victorian era